The 1993 Campeonato Brasileiro Série A was the 37th edition of the Campeonato Brasileiro Série A.

Overview
It was contested by 32 teams, and Palmeiras won the championship.

Format
The first phase of the season had the 32 teams divided into four groups of eight teams.  The top three teams from group A and group B qualified for the second phase.  The top two teams from group C and group D would playoff to determine two more teams for the second phase.  The bottom four teams from group C and group D were relegated.

First phase

Group A

Results

Group B

Group C

Group D

Playoffs

Second phase

Group E

Group F

Final

Final standings

References

1993
1